Stephan Mølvig (born 13 February 1979 in Odense) is a Danish lightweight rower who has won one Olympic and two World Championship gold medals.

He studied at St Catherine's College, Oxford (2005, School of Geography and the Environment, University of Oxford), which has a strong Olympic Games tradition.

References

External links

1979 births
Living people
Danish male rowers
Olympic rowers of Denmark
Rowers at the 2004 Summer Olympics
Olympic gold medalists for Denmark
Olympic medalists in rowing
Medalists at the 2004 Summer Olympics
Sportspeople from Odense
World Rowing Championships medalists for Denmark